Kate Quarrie is a Canadian politician who served as the second female mayor of Guelph, Ontario from 2003 to 2006.

A native of Guelph, Kate Quarrie was defeated by Karen Farbridge in the November 2006 municipal election.

References

External links
 Kate Quarrie's bio page at the City of Guelph official site

Mayors of Guelph
Living people
Year of birth missing (living people)
Women mayors of places in Ontario
21st-century Canadian politicians
21st-century Canadian women politicians